Raphitoma digiulioi is a species of sea snail, a marine gastropod mollusk in the family Raphitomidae.

Distribution
This species occurs in the Mediterranean Sea off Corsica

References

 Pusateri F., Giannuzzi Savelli R., Bartolini S. & Oliverio M. (2017). A revision of the Mediterranean Raphitomidae (Neogastropoda, Conoidea) 4: The species of the group of Raphitoma purpurea (Montagu, 1803) with the description of a new species. Bollettino Malacologico. 53(2): 161-183.

External links
 Biolib.cz: Raphitoma digiulioi

digiulioi
Gastropods described in 2017